Nini Adrian Popescu (born 26 April 1994) is a Romanian professional footballer who plays as a midfielder for Liga II side CSC 1599 Șelimbăr. In his career, Popescu also played for teams such as: Petrolul Ploiești, Unirea Slobozia, Gloria Buzău or FC Argeș Pitești, among others.

Honours
Petrolul Ploiești

Liga IV - Prahova County: 2016–17
Liga III: 2017–18

References

External links
 
 

1994 births
Living people
Sportspeople from Ploiești
Romanian footballers
Association football midfielders
Liga I players
Liga II players
Liga III players
FC Petrolul Ploiești players
AFC Unirea Slobozia players
FC Gloria Buzău players
FC Argeș Pitești players
CSM Reșița players
CS Concordia Chiajna players
CS Gloria Bistrița-Năsăud footballers
CSC 1599 Șelimbăr players